John Hayden (born February 14, 1995) is an American professional ice hockey center who is currently playing for the Coachella Valley Firebirds in the American Hockey League (AHL) while under contract to the Seattle Kraken of the National Hockey League (NHL).

Early life
Hayden was born in Chicago, Illinois but immediately moved to Denver, Colorado before settling in Greenwich, Connecticut with his family when he was eight years old. As a youth, he played in the 2007 and 2008 Quebec International Pee-Wee Hockey Tournaments with the New Hampshire Nike Bauer minor ice hockey team, and then with the Detroit Honeybaked team. He attended Brunswick School before committing to play hockey at Yale University.

Playing career
Hayden was drafted by his hometown team, the Chicago Blackhawks in the third round, 74th overall in the 2013 NHL Entry Draft, after playing two seasons within the USA Hockey National Team Development Program in the United States Hockey League (USHL).

Upon the completion of his collegiate career, captaining the Bulldogs as a senior in the 2016–17 season, Hayden embarked on his professional career in agreeing to a two-year, entry-level contract on March 15, 2017. 
He immediately began his contract in making his NHL debut against the Ottawa Senators on March 16, 2017. In his second game he scored his first NHL goal against the Toronto Maple Leafs on March 18, 2017.

In his first full season with the Blackhawks in 2018–19, Hayden played in a fourth-line role, contributing with 3 goals and 5 points in 54 games.

On June 22, 2019, at the 2019 NHL Entry Draft, Hayden was traded by the Blackhawks to the New Jersey Devils in exchange for John Quenneville. In the 2019–20 season, Hayden played in 43 games for the New Jersey Devils, playing in a fourth-line forward role recording 3 goals and an assist. As an impending restricted free agent, Hayden was not tendered a qualifying offer from the Devils and was released to free agency on October 8, 2020.

On the following day, Hayden was signed by the Arizona Coyotes after agreeing to a one-year, $750,000 contract. In his lone season with the Coyotes in the pandemic shortened  campaign, Hayden made 29 appearances, posting 2 goals and 5 points.

As an impending restricted free agent, Hayden was not tendered a qualifying offer by the Coyotes, releasing him as a free agent. On July 29, 2021, Hayden was signed to a one-year, two-way contract with the Buffalo Sabres.

On July 14, 2022, Hayden was signed as a free agent to a one-year, two-way contract with the Seattle Kraken.

Personal life
Hayden is the son of Diana and Mark Hayden. His brother, Will attended Wake Forest University and his sister Catherine plays for the University of North Carolina field hockey team.

While attending Yale, Hayden majored in political science where he balanced his coursework while playing for the Blackhawks and graduated in 2017.
He also worked as an intern for the Pelican Breeze apparel company.

Career statistics

Regular season and playoffs

International

Awards and honors

References

External links
 

1995 births
Living people
American men's ice hockey centers
Arizona Coyotes players
Brunswick School alumni
Buffalo Sabres players
Chicago Blackhawks draft picks
Chicago Blackhawks players
Coachella Valley Firebirds players
Ice hockey players from Connecticut
New Jersey Devils players
Rockford IceHogs (AHL) players
Seattle Kraken players
USA Hockey National Team Development Program players
Yale Bulldogs men's ice hockey players